Eumundi Rugby Union Club is a rugby union football club based located in Eumundi, Queensland. The club currently play in the Sunshine Coast Rugby Union junior competitions.

History 
The original Eumundi club played in the North Coast Rugby Union competition. Clubs in this competition would move over to rugby league.

A revived Eumundi returned to rugby union in the 21st century playing mainly in the junior ranks. They fielded an adult side for the first time since 1919 in 2020.

In 2022 the club is scheduled to host an A grade fixture for the first time. The contest is due to be between University and Caloundra.

References

External links
 
 

Sunshine Coast Rugby Union
Sport in the Sunshine Coast, Queensland
Sunshine Coast, Queensland